Remi Van Vreckom (1 April 1943 – 5 December 2000) was a Belgian racing cyclist. He rode in the 1968 Tour de France.

References

1943 births
2000 deaths
Belgian male cyclists
Place of birth missing